A White House social aide is a United States Armed Forces officer assigned to attend to the personal needs of visiting dignitaries at the White House and to facilitate interactions with the President of the United States and the First Lady of the United States. White House social aides were first appointed in 1902; as of 2014, there were 45 such officers.

History

The first White House social aides were appointed in 1902 during the presidency of Theodore Roosevelt. Until 1969 only men were permitted to serve as social aides; in that year, Richard Nixon approved the appointment of female social aides. As of 2014, there were 45 social aides. Social aides have been drawn from the United States Army, United States Navy, United States Air Force, United States Marine Corps, United States Coast Guard, and the National Guard of the United States.

Duties

White House social aides report to a coordinator in the office of the White House Social Secretary. Their duties include managing "guests who attend social functions at the White House, [facilitating] interactions with the president and first lady and [escorting] dignitaries". In the past, this has included entertaining single guests, such as providing dance companions; initiating small talk with lonely guests during teas; directing the flow of traffic at receiving lines; and greeting visitors.

When visitors are received by the President of the United States, three social aides are assigned to coordinate the interaction: the "whispering aide" who whispers the visitor's name to the president, the "introducing aide" who presents the visitor to the president, and the "pulling off aide" who encourages the visitor to step away once the president signals the interaction has concluded.

Social aides are also expected to identify and resolve social miscues; during one visit by King Hussein of Jordan to the White House during the presidency of Ronald Reagan, a reporter attempted to cut in on the king to ask him questions during social dancing. According to The New York Times, a social aide "came to the rescue by cutting in and deftly waltzing the young woman off the dance floor".

Selection
White House social aides must be commissioned officers with a rank no higher than major (or lieutenant commander in the Navy or Coast Guard), be assigned to Washington, D.C., and have "impeccable appearance".

According to a statement provided to The New York Times, the past restriction on married social aides was due to the significant evening demands placed on aides that might interfere with their marital relationship. However, Stephen Bauer – who served as a social aide – has written that the prohibition on wedded aides is to prevent a scandal developing in the event a social aide is invited into a romantic relationship with a guest. This is no longer a requirement as of early 2021.

Because social aides have direct access to the President of the United States, prospective aides must successfully pass a Yankee White review demonstrating their "unquestionable loyalty to the United States".

Notable social aides
 As daughter of President of the United States Lyndon Johnson, Lynda Bird Johnson was given "pick of the litter" of White House social aides and ultimately selected Marine Captain Charles Robb as her personal escort. She later wed Robb in 1967 in a White House ceremony; Robb would ultimately become the 64th Governor of Virginia.
 Gerald F. "Gerry" Richman, a corporate lawyer and formerly president of Richman-Greer, a South Florida law firm, was a White House social aide during the Johnson administration. Richman is rumored to have had the opportunity to escort Lynda Bird Johnson, but passed on it to Robb because Richman already had a conflicting date with a Miss Universe contestant.
 Brian Lamb, later chief executive officer of C-SPAN, was a White House social aide during the Johnson administration; among his duties were escorting Lady Bird Johnson during the wedding of Lynda Bird Johnson and Robb.
 Abelardo L. Valdez, assistant administrator of the United States Agency for International Development, served as a social aide during the presidency of Lyndon Johnson.
 Major General Marcelite J. Harris was a White House social aide during the presidency of Jimmy Carter.
 Vice Admiral Jody A. Breckenridge was a White House social aide.
 In 2015, Captain John Fesler became the first social aide appointed from the Air National Guard.
 Stephen Kappes as a Marine Officer served as a social aide to President Carter and later became the Deputy Director of the Central Intelligence Agency

The Society of White House Military Aides
The Society of White House Military Aides grew from an idea of camaraderie and friendship shared through their unique experiences while serving their nation’s presidents. It is their purpose to continue to renew those friendships through the society and preserve the history and honor of their service. Their members represent military aides from twelve administrations, comprising both current and past White House social and presidential aides from the Roosevelt Administration to that of George W. Bush, and five branches of the service: the Army, Navy, Air Force, Marines and the Coast Guard.  Honorary members include social secretaries to the President and those members of the White House Military Office who worked directly with military aides.

Since its founding in 1991 by Chairman Kenn Riordan, Jr. (Reagan), the society has grown from fifty aides to over 600 aides and has been incorporated with legal counsel.  The two most senior members served as aides to President Roosevelt; another, White House Curator, Mr. Rex Scouten, served ten presidents.  Included in their ranks are two presidents of the American Red Cross; members of the Council of Foreign Relations; a Chairman of the Joint Chiefs of Staff; a CINCPAC; two women who retired as the highest ranking in their services; a  U.S. Senator; the founder of C-SPAN; a founding partner of the Carlyle Group; three university presidents; and a CEO of PepsiCo. All were White House social or presidential aides, and members.

Gallery

See also
 Aide-de-camp
 Body man

References

White House Military Office
White House staff